Anita Louise Barone is an American actress. She is known for co-starring roles in sitcoms The Jeff Foxworthy Show, Daddio, Shake It Up, The War at Home and Friends.

Life and career
Barone was born in St. Louis, Missouri. She earned her BFA from the University of Detroit in 1986, followed by an MFA from Wayne State University, where she was taught by director/professor Robert T. Hazzard.

Barone appeared in the fourth-season Seinfeld episode "The Shoes" as Gail Cunningham, a chef who wants Elaine Benes' shoes. In the early 1990s, she was a regular cast member of Carol & Company with actress Carol Burnett. Barone also played Carol Willick, Ross Geller's ex-wife, in the character's first appearance in Friends. She left the show as she wanted to pursue a more full-time role and was replaced by Jane Sibbett. She starred on The Jeff Foxworthy Show for the first season (1995–1996) and in The War at Home from 2005 to 2007. In 2000, Barone also co-starred in the sitcom Daddio.

Barone's other television credits include Curb Your Enthusiasm, Quantum Leap, Empty Nest, Chicago Hope, Castle, Do Not Disturb, Ally McBeal, Caroline in the City, Party of Five and The Larry Sanders Show.

In 2004, she was the recipient of the 2005 Methodfest Best Supporting Actress Award for her work in feature film, One Last Ride.

In 2010, three years after The War at Home ended its run, Barone began her recurring role in the Disney Channel sitcom Shake It Up as Officer Georgia Jones, the mother of Bella Thorne's character CeCe Jones. Barone's husband, actor Matthew Glave, guest starred in two episodes of Shake It Up as J.J. Jones, the ex-husband of Barone's character.

Personal life
Barone is married to actor Matthew Glave, with whom she has two daughters, Madeline and Roxanne. She currently lives in Los Angeles with her family.

Filmography

Films

Television

References

External links

Living people
20th-century American actresses
21st-century American actresses
Actresses from St. Louis
American film actresses
American television actresses
University of Detroit Mercy alumni
Wayne State University alumni
Year of birth missing (living people)